Gardie may refer to:

De la Gardie, Swedish noble family of French origin
Pontus De la Gardie (1520–1585), soldier
Jacob De la Gardie (1583–1652), statesman and soldier
Magnus Gabriel De la Gardie (1622–1686), statesman
Axel Julius De la Gardie (1637–1710), field marshal
De la Gardie Campaign, led by Jacob De la Gardie
Gardie, Aude, commune in France
Gardie House, Shetland
the Japanese name for Growlithe, a fictional Pokémon